John de Beauchamp, 2nd Baron Beauchamp may refer to: 

 John de Beauchamp, 2nd Baron Beauchamp (first creation)  (died 1343)
 John de Beauchamp, 2nd Baron Beauchamp (fourth creation) (1378–1420)